Daniel Robbins may refer to:

Daniel Robbins (art historian) (1932-1995), onetime director of the Fogg Museum 
Daniel Robbins (computer programmer), founder of the Gentoo Linux project
Daniel Robbins (director), director of Pledge (2018 film)